The Clark County Courthouse at 200 N. Commercial St. in Clark, South Dakota serves Clark County.  It was listed on the National Register of Historic Places in 2002.

It is a three-story brick and stone building, designed by Hugill & Blatherwick in Art Deco style and built in 1934.  Its interior features pink Tennessee marble.

References

Courthouses in South Dakota
Courthouses on the National Register of Historic Places in South Dakota
Art Deco architecture in South Dakota
Government buildings completed in 1934
Clark County, South Dakota
1934 establishments in South Dakota